Ezhai Pangalan is a 1963 Indian Tamil-language film directed by K. Shankar, written by M. Lakshmanan and produced by K. V. Mahadevan, who also composed the music. The film stars Gemini Ganesan, Ragini, Pushpalatha and M. N. Nambiar. It was released on 20 December 1963.

Plot

Cast 

Male cast
Gemini Ganesan as Raja
M. N. Nambiar
S. A. Ashokan
T. S. Muthiah
K. Balaji
V. Mahalingam
S. V. Ramadas
K. D. Santhanam
Nagesh

Female cast
Ragini
Pushpalatha
Manorama
Malathi
M. S. S. Bhyagyam
Lakshmi Prabha
S. M. Dharma
Radhabhai
Aalwar Kuppusamy

Production 
Ezhai Pangalan is the inaugural production of Rajalaxmi Pictures. It was produced by K. V. Mahadevan, and directed by K. Shankar. The film was written by M. Lakshmanan. Cinematography was handled by Thambu, and K. S. Baskar served as the operative cameraman. K. Narayanan was the editor, while A. Balu was the art director.

Themes 
Ezhai Pangalan deals with the problems of slum dwellers.

Soundtrack 
The soundtrack was composed by K. V. Mahadevan and the lyrics were written by Kannadasan, Vaali and Panchu Arunachalam.

Release 
Ezhai Pangalan was released on 20 December 1963, and distributed by Mahalakshmi Pictures. T. M. Ramachadran, writing for Sport and Pastime, lauded it as a "realistic, purposeful film".

References

External links 
 

1960s Tamil-language films
1963 films
Films directed by K. Shankar
Films scored by K. V. Mahadevan